Osielec  is a village in the administrative district of Gmina Jordanów, within Sucha County, Lesser Poland Voivodeship, in southern Poland.

The village has a population of 3,000.

References

Osielec